Yasser Abdullah (Arabic:ياسر عبد الله) (born 10 May 1988) is an Emirati footballer. He currently plays as a defender for Al Bataeh.

References

External links
 

Emirati footballers
1988 births
Living people
Al Dhafra FC players
Al-Ittihad Kalba SC players
Al Wahda FC players
Sharjah FC players
Dibba FC players
Hatta Club players
Al Bataeh Club players
Association football defenders
UAE First Division League players
UAE Pro League players